The Best Years of Our Lives is the third studio album by Steve Harley & Cockney Rebel, which was released by EMI in 1975. It was the first album to feature Harley's name ahead of the band's (the band was previously known as Cockney Rebel). The album was produced by Harley and Alan Parsons, and contains the band's only UK number one, the million-selling "Make Me Smile (Come Up and See Me)".

Background
In July 1974, the original Cockney Rebel split at the end of a major British tour which promoted their second album The Psychomodo. Jean-Paul Crocker, Milton Reame-James and Paul Jeffreys quit the band after Harley refused to comply with their demands to write material for the group, despite the initial understanding that Cockney Rebel was a vehicle for Harley's songs. Unfazed by the split, Harley announced to Record Mirror that he was going to return with "the greatest rock 'n' roll band ever heard". In 2014, he recalled, "The people at EMI were right behind me. They believed I could find new band members without too much of a problem and continue on to a new level of success. They believed it wasn't a major stumbling block."

As Cockney Rebel were already scheduled to play Friars Aylesbury and the Reading Festival on 24 and 25 August respectively, Harley quickly assembled a temporary line-up. With original member Stuart Elliott remaining on drums, the line-up featured guitarist Jim Cregan, keyboardist Francis Monkman and bassist George Ford. The permanent line-up was finalised in September 1974 and featured the same musicians minus Monkman, who was replaced by Duncan Mackay. Harley renamed the new group Steve Harley & Cockney Rebel. The band performed their first concerts in Holland between 18 and 26 September 1974 before playing their first UK dates between 17 and 19 October 1974 at Southampton University, London's Rainbow Theatre and Lancaster University.

In November and December 1974, the band recorded The Best Years of Our Lives at Abbey Road Studios and Air Studios in London. Speaking to Record & Popswop Mirror in November 1974, Harley said, "The best work I've done yet is on the new LP. I find that I'm not writing in such a surrealistic way anymore. I'm writing slightly more blatant, less subtle. The whole album is a theme. The whole story is a dialogue, almost between two people – or a group of people and the artist: questions and answers. It's kind of like a guy who goes through a metamorphosis and comes out of it in good shape – alive and kicking." He added to the magazine in 1975, "This album is something I believe in. It means so much to me than anything I have done before."

Release
Preceding the release of The Best Years of Our Lives was the single "Make Me Smile (Come Up and See Me)", which was released in January 1975. As the band's biggest hit, the song reached the number one spot in the UK Singles Chart in February and received a silver certification that month. As of 2015, it has sold around 1.5 million copies in the UK. Years later, Harley revealed that the lyrics were vindictively directed at Harley's former band members who, he felt, had abandoned him. Over 120 cover versions of the song have been recorded by other artists.

The Best Years of Our Lives was released by EMI on 7 March 1975 and reached number 4 in the UK Albums Chart. The album's second single, "Mr. Raffles (Man, It Was Mean)", was released in May and became another UK hit, peaked at number 13. The song's titular character refers to the author E. W. Hornung's fictional thief A. J. Raffles.

The album received its first CD release by EMI in 1991. It featured two bonus tracks, the B-side of "Make Me Smile (Come Up and See Me)", "Another Journey", and a live version of "Sebastian", which was the B-side to "Mr. Raffles (Man, It Was Mean)". In 2001, BGO Records released a remastered edition of the album, but without any bonus tracks.

On 23 June 2014, a definitive edition of the album was released by Parlophone as a four CD + DVD box-set. On disc one is the original album, the B-side "Another Journey", and previously unreleased early demo versions of "Make Me Smile (Come Up And See Me)" and "The Best Years of Our Lives". The second and third discs feature tracks from the band's concert at the Hammersmith Odeon on 14 April 1975, and the 28-minute DVD features footage from the same concert. In August 2014, a 180-gram vinyl reissue of the album was released in the Netherlands by Music on Vinyl. To celebrate its 45th anniversary, Chrysalis released an expanded edition of the album on double vinyl in the UK and Europe on 5 April 2021.

Tour
To promote the album, the band embarked on a UK and European tour from March 1975 onwards. On the tour, the band hired guitarist Snowy White to play rhythm guitar. In a January 1975 issue of Record & Popswop Mirror, it was announced that the upcoming tour would feature "a specially built set and lighting to reflect songs and images featured on the forthcoming album". Later in the year they toured America, as a support act for The Kinks.

To celebrate the 40th anniversary of the album and "Make Me Smile", a 16-date UK tour was announced for November 2015. Harley, who has continued to play with various Cockney Rebel incarnations since the 1970s, reunited with the surviving members of the original second line-up for the tour (Cregan, Elliott and Mackay). The band's bassist, George Ford, had died in 2007. The tour marked the first time that the line-up had played together since 1976. On the tour, the band performed two sets at each show, one featuring a selection of tracks from Harley and the band's career, and the second featuring The Best Years of Our Lives in its entirety. Speaking to Classic Rock, in March 2015, Harley commented, "The three guys are still my mates. The fun we had back then, when we toured and recorded together, holds fabulous and special memories. I'm thrilled to think they'll be up there on the great UK concert hall stages with me once again."

Critical reception
On its release, Record Mirror commented, "Forget No 1 singles; this will change everything. In nine songs, Harley wipes out his two-album apprenticeship with a stunning change of direction and commitment. It is a coming of age, a political and religious protest, a brilliant snap-book for a generation, a puzzle. In short, this third album demands attention. It is completely fulfilling, a monster unleashed." Liverpool Echo wrote, "'Make Me Smile' is undoubtedly one of the best singles of the year but this should not obscure the rest of the album. Taken overall it is a great improvement on his previous efforts."

Pete Butterfield of the Reading Evening Post commented, "Like Harley or not, he's got a heap of talent. This album is as full of ideas as the first stemming wholely from the unique vocal talent." John Falding of the Birmingham Daily Post wrote, "One man who must have been listening to too much Ziggy, and more than a little Dylan, is Steve Harley. The Best Years of Our Lives is a poor pastiche of Bowie a couple of years ago. Harley has made an interesting single but the LP does not match it."

In the US, Cash Box commented, "Steve Harley and Cockney Rebel have a surefire smash with their latest. The band cooks and grinds in the David Bowie style with the emphasis on the spacey light pop rock sound that is very heavy today in the pop market. This should get heavy FM play with our favorites 'The Mad, Mad Moonlight,' 'It Wasn't Me,' 'Make Me Smile (Come Up and See Me)' and the title cut." Justin Pierce of the Los Angeles Times stated, "Stylistically, [the album] compares favorably with the acoustically based David Bowie/Mott the Hoople school of rock. Harley continues to explore themes built around his views of a confused society and the changes it is constantly enduring. Harley's writing is still in an embryonic stage, but there is promise." Keith Sharp of the Calgary Herald commented, "All of a sudden, Harley's decided to take himself seriously. Those bizarre, humorous lyrics that marked his last album have been replaced by Dylanesque social comment. He can't blame his band for the pool quality of the record. His new Rebels have saved the album by at least making it listenable."

Retrospective reviews

In a review of the 1991 EMI CD release, Mark Sinker of Select highlighted the "baroque glam-pop charts hits" "Make Me Smile (Come Up and See Me)" and "Mr. Raffles". Donald A. Guarisco of AllMusic retrospectively said, "By his third album, Harley had developed a strong grasp of how to combine his artistic ambitions with strongly crafted pop tunes that win the casual listener over to his artsy cause. The result was The Best Years of Our Lives, the most successful album of his mid-'70s heyday. All in all, it is a fine, slickly crafted album that will delight Steve Harley enthusiasts and will also appeal to fans of glam-oriented 1970s English rock."

Track listing
All songs written and composed by Steve Harley.

Charts

Personnel
Steve Harley & Cockney Rebel
 Steve Harley – vocals
 Jim Cregan – electric guitar, acoustic guitar, backing vocals
 George Ford – bass guitar, string bass, backing vocals
 Duncan Mackay – electric piano, grand piano, elka, clavinet, synthesizer, Hammond organ
 Stuart Elliott – drums, percussion, marimba

Additional musicians
 Tina Charles – backing vocals
 Martin Jay – backing vocals
 Yvonne Keeley – backing vocals
 Linda Lewis – backing vocals
 Liza Strike – backing vocals

Production
 Steve Harley - producer
 Alan Parsons – producer, engineer, mixing
 Gary Edwards – tape operator
 Peter James – tape operator
 Andrew Powell - horn and brass arrangement (track 5)
 Chris Blair – mastering

Design
 Mick Rock – photography, sleeve design
 George Hardie – lettering

References

Steve Harley & Cockney Rebel albums
1975 albums
Albums produced by Alan Parsons
Albums with cover art by Mick Rock
EMI Records albums